Kickapoo is an unincorporated community in Kickapoo Township, Leavenworth County, Kansas, United States.  It is part of the Kansas City metropolitan area.

History
Kickapoo was laid out in 1854. It was named after the Kickapoo people.

Kickapoo was a station on the Missouri Pacific Railroad.

The post office in Kickapoo closed in 1920.

References

Further reading

External links
 Leavenworth County maps: Current, Historic, KDOT

Unincorporated communities in Leavenworth County, Kansas
Unincorporated communities in Kansas